Jocara breviornatalis is a species of snout moth in the genus Jocara. It was described by Augustus Radcliffe Grote in 1877. It is found in the U.S. states of Texas, Oklahoma and Florida.

References

Moths described in 1877
Jocara